Daniela Alves Lima (born 12 January 1984), commonly known as Daniela, is a former Brazilian football midfielder who played for professional clubs in Brazil, Sweden and the United States. As a member of the Brazil women's national football team she participated in two FIFA Women's World Cups and three Olympic Games. Daniela was a box-to-box central midfielder who was renowned for her powerful long range shots.

Club career
Daniela had already played for four seasons at the women's section of São Paulo club Portuguesa, when she was signed by San Diego Spirit of Women's United Soccer Association (WUSA). Having turned 19 the month before her February 2003 transfer, Daniela became WUSA's youngest player. She started 14 of her 17 regular season appearances in 2003 and posted three assists. When WUSA collapsed at the end of that season, Daniela moved to Europe and signed for Kopparbergs/Göteborg FC of Sweden's Damallsvenskan. She made three league appearances and scored one goal in a 2004 season beset by injury.

For 2005 Daniela moved back to the United States and played four games for Hampton Roads Piranhas in the pro–am W-League. She finished the 2005 season playing in the Women's Premier Soccer League (WPSL) with Bay State Select, scoring seven goals in 10 appearances. She remained with Bay State for 2006 and was named to the all-league team in both 2005 and 2006, before returning to Brazil with Saad Esporte Clube. At the inaugural 2007 edition of the Copa do Brasil de Futebol Feminino, Daniela was named player of the tournament and was top goalscorer with 14 goals as Saad won the trophy.

Sweden's Linköpings FC contracted Daniela and her Brazil teammate Cristiane for the 2008 Damallsvenskan season. After signing, Daniela stressed that she had improved as a player since her unhappy experience at Göteborg in 2004. She played in all 22 of Linköpings' league matches, scoring six goals, as the team finished runners-up behind Umeå IK.

Women's Professional Soccer (WPS), a new professional league formed in the United States, entered Daniela into its inaugural International Draft. She was selected as the Saint Louis Athletica's first pick and joined the team for its 2009 season.

In Athletica's fourth game against the Washington Freedom, Daniela scored the club's first two goals of the season in a fractious and controversial 3–3 draw. During the match, a challenge by Abby Wambach, described as "vicious" and "reckless", left Daniela with a broken tibia and torn knee ligaments. Wambach received a yellow card for the tackle but was later given a one-match suspension by the league's disciplinary panel. Saint Louis Athletica's doctor said that the injury would rule Daniela out "indefinitely".

She made a comeback with Hampton Road Piranhas in the 2010 W-League, but featured for 18 minutes of one match. The injury brought about Daniela's early retirement from football. She returned to São Paulo and became the proprietor of a butcher shop.

International career
Brazil wanted to include Daniela in their squad for the 1999 FIFA Women's World Cup but at the age of 15 years she was not eligible to participate. Instead she made her debut in the next game, a friendly defeat to the United States. An inexperienced Brazil lost 6–0 to the world champions at Mile High Stadium in Denver on 26 September 1999.

At 16 years old Daniela was a member of the Brazil team that participated in the 2000 Sydney Olympics and finished in fourth place. At the pre-tournament training camp Daniela fought with teammate Mônica. The confrontation was attributed to premenstrual syndrome.

Daniela captained Brazil's under-19 team at the 2002 FIFA U-19 Women's World Championship, scoring three goals as the team reached the semi-final. Ahead of the 2003 FIFA Women's World Cup, she was named in Brazil's squad and praised by the coach: "She is very good. Everyone is interested in her." At the tournament she performed well and struck a celebrated goal as Brazil upset Olympic champions Norway 4–1. Sweden defeated Brazil 2–1 in the quarter-final.

Daniela and Brazil collected silver medals at the 2004 and 2008 editions of the Olympic Games. At the 2007 FIFA Women's World Cup in China, Brazil produced a striking 4–0 semi-final win over the United States but were beaten 2–0 by Germany in the final. Daniela and teammates Marta, Cristiane and Rosana were nicknamed "the fantastic four".

Notes

References

External links
 
 Profile at Women's Professional Soccer
 Profile at Women's United Soccer Association

1984 births
Living people
Brazilian women's footballers
Women's association football midfielders
Footballers from São Paulo
Footballers at the 2000 Summer Olympics
Footballers at the 2004 Summer Olympics
Footballers at the 2008 Summer Olympics
Footballers at the 2007 Pan American Games
Olympic footballers of Brazil
Olympic silver medalists for Brazil
Olympic medalists in football
Saint Louis Athletica players
Expatriate women's footballers in Sweden
Expatriate women's soccer players in the United States
Brazilian expatriate sportspeople in Sweden
Brazilian expatriate sportspeople in the United States
Women's United Soccer Association players
San Diego Spirit players
Medalists at the 2008 Summer Olympics
Medalists at the 2004 Summer Olympics
Brazil women's international footballers
Brazilian expatriate women's footballers
BK Häcken FF players
Damallsvenskan players
Linköpings FC players
Pan American Games gold medalists for Brazil
Pan American Games medalists in football
Saad Esporte Clube (women) players
2007 FIFA Women's World Cup players
Bay State Select players
Women's Premier Soccer League players
2003 FIFA Women's World Cup players
Medalists at the 2007 Pan American Games
Hampton Roads Piranhas players
Women's Professional Soccer players